Bit-Twist is a libpcap-based packet generator and packet capture file modifier and replayer.  It complements tcpdump, a packet capturing tool also built upon the packet capturing engine libpcap. Bit-Twist allows you to regenerate packets from one or more pcap files. It also comes with a comprehensive pcap file editor to allow advance manipulation of packet information, e.g. fields in Ethernet, ARP, IP, ICMP, TCP, and UDP headers,  prior to regenerating the packets onto the network.

Bit-Twist is commonly used to simulate network traffic to test firewall rules, IDS, and IPS. Bit-Twist runs on FreeBSD, NetBSD, OpenBSD, Mac OS X, Linux, and Microsoft Windows.

External links 
Bit-Twist official website

Internet Protocol based network software